Pultenaea trifida, commonly known as Kangaroo Island bush-pea,<ref name="efloraSA">{{cite web |title=Pultenaea trifida'''' |url=http://www.flora.sa.gov.au/cgi-bin/speciesfacts_display.cgi?form=speciesfacts&name=Pultenaea_trifida |publisher=State Herbarium of South Australia |access-date=13 September 2021}}</ref> is a species of flowering plant in the family Fabaceae and is endemic to Kangaroo Island in South Australia. It is an erect to prostrate shrub with hairy branches, egg-shaped to more or less round leaves, and relatively few yellow to orange and red, pea-like flowers.

The flowers are relatively few in number and arranged singly or in small groups near the ends of short side shoots.

TaxonomyPultenaea trifida was first formally described in 1909 by John McConnell Black in the Transactions, proceedings and report, Royal Society of South Australia from specimens collected in 1908. The specific epithet (trifida'') means "three-forked".

Distribution and habitat
Kangaroo Island bush-pea is common in heath and mallee on Kangaroo Island.

References

Fabales of Australia
Flora of South Australia
trifida
Plants described in 1909
Taxa named by John McConnell Black